The Order of Excellence of Guyana is the highest national award of Guyana.  Established in 1970 under the Constitution of the Orders of Guyana, it is limited to 25 living citizens of Guyana. This is the highest award of the state and is given to citizens of Guyana for distinction and eminence in the field of human endeavor which is of either national or international significance and importance. Any distinguished citizen of another country who has rendered valued service to Guyana or whom the state wishes to honour for any reason, may be given an honorary award.

References

See also 
 Orders, decorations, and medals of Guyana

Orders, decorations, and medals of Guyana
Awards established in 1970
1970 establishments in Guyana